The Communist Party USA has held thirty official conventions including nomination conventions and conventions held while the party was known as the Workers Party of America, the Workers (Communist) Party of America and the Communist Political Association. There were also a number of congresses held by the earlier (though often underground) organizational predecessors of the party, including the Communist Labor Party of America, the United Communist Party and two groups known as the Communist Party of America. The Communist Party's 30th National Convention took place on 13 to 15 June 2014 in Chicago.

Left Wing Conference 
A resolution for a national conference of left leaning organizations within the Socialist Party of America had been adopted by the Boston Local in May 1919 and endorsed by a number of other locals. Admittance as left-wing was defined as endorsement of the Left Wing program adopted by the Left Wing Section of Greater New York. When the conference met the delegates divided between a group around the periodical The Revolutionary Age that wanted to infiltrate the Socialist Party's convention in Chicago that September and those who wished to create a Communist Party immediately. The minority withdrew and formed the National Organization Committee for a Communist Party. This group was mainly made up of the suspended language federations and the Socialist Party of Michigan.

The majority formed a National Left Wing Council and attempted to arrange a take over of the socialist party's convention. However, by late August the majority decided to forgo this plan and joined with the National Organization Committee to create a new party at a convention in Chicago. A minority, led by Ben Gitlow and John Reed split with the majority and attempted to infiltrate the Socialist Party convention alone.
 Revolutionary Age Vol II #1 July 5, 1919 Includes manifesto, program, reports, and preliminary minutes of the conference
 Revolutionary Age Vol II #5 July 5, 1919 Includes first half of the official stenographic proceedings of the conference
 Revolutionary Age Vol II #6 August 9, 1919 Extracts from the remainder of the record

Communist Party of America (1919)

Communist Labor Party/United Communist Party

Communist Party of America (1921)

Workers Party of America

Workers (Communist) Party of America

Communist Party USA

Footnotes 

 William Z. Foster History of the Communist Party of the United States New York: International Publishers, 1952 Appendix A. Gives starting date of all conventions up to 1951.

See also 
 1922 Bridgman Convention
 Communist Party USA

External links 
 Early American Marxism has extensive information about the earlier conventions.

 
Political conventions in Chicago